Abdur Rehman (born 31 July 1989) is a Pakistani first-class cricketer who plays for Khan Research Laboratories.

References

External links
 

1989 births
Living people
Pakistani cricketers
Khan Research Laboratories cricketers
Cricketers from Lahore